Take Care is a 2014 comedy-drama film directed by Liz Tuccillo. The plot involves a woman who, after getting hit by a car, realizes who her true friends are who don't want to care for her as she heals. She then forced to enlist the help of her ex-boyfriend, whom she believes owes her since she had taken care of him when he was hurt during their relationship.

Cast
 Leslie Bibb as Frannie
 Tracee Chimo as Rachel
 Kevin Curtis as Lawrence
 Nadia Dajani as Fallon
 Betty Gilpin as Jodi
 Michael Godere as Jason
 Marin Ireland as Laila
 Elizabeth Rodriguez as Nurse Janet
 Thomas Sadoski as Devon
 Michael Stahl-David as Kyle
 Tim Wu as Chef Wu
 Heena Shim as Friend (uncredited)

Reception
  On Metacritic, the film has a score of 34 out of 100 based on 8 critics, indicating "generally unfavorable reviews".  Glenn Kenny of RogerEbert.com awarded the film two stars.  Sandie Angulo Chen of Common Sense Media gave the film two stars out of five.

References

External links
 
 
 
 

2014 films
American comedy-drama films
2014 comedy-drama films
2010s English-language films
2010s American films
English-language comedy-drama films